79 Tauri, also known as b Tauri, is an Am star in the constellation of Taurus with an apparent magnitude of 5.0.

The spectrum of 79 Tauri shows abnormal abundances of metals, with many showing unusually strong absorption lines, but some such as calcium showing weaker lines than expected.  This is represented in the spectral type kA5hF0VmF0, which is F0 based on its hydrogen lines, but A5 based on its calcium K-lines, and F0 based on the lines of other metals.  Other publications often give the spectral class based on hydrogen lines as A7.  It is classified as an Am star, a type of star with strong magnetic fields and slow rotation causing stratification of elements within its atmosphere.

79 Tauri lies about two degrees south of the main V asterism of the Hyades open cluster. It lies 11 light years from the centre of the cluster and is generally considered to be a member.

References

Taurus (constellation)
Tauri, b
Tauri, 079
A-type main-sequence stars
Durchmusterung objects
028355
1414
020901